Crawford College, Pretoria is an independent school (private school) in Pretoria, Gauteng, South Africa. It has active sporting and culture programs.

History
Crawford College, Pretoria the Pretoria Campus of the Crawford Schools, a network of private schools. It was founded as the Carmel school in the Lukasrand suburb of Pretoria, to educate the large local Jewish community. After the school was acquired by Graeme Crawford it became Crawford College, Pretoria, with new buildings constructed for the College and the takeover of the old facilities by the Preparatory School.

In 2005 the buildings were extended and renovated. A new media center, art studio, technology and design studio, and drama classrooms were built.

The school has numerous sporting facilities including basketball courts, a cricket field, a swimming pool, and the Harlequins Field adjacent to the campus. The school has won the Co-ed Inter-High Gala, a swimming event in 2005, 2006, and 2007. Numerous South African Olympic Team swimmers were students at Crawford College Pretoria.

Sports
Crawford College, Pretoria competes in the following sports:
 Basketball
 Chess 
 Cricket
 Football (soccer)
 Swimming

References

External links
Crawford Web Page

Jewish schools in South Africa
Jews and Judaism in Pretoria
Private schools in Gauteng
Schools in Pretoria
1996 establishments in South Africa
Educational institutions established in 1996